The 2007–08 Temple Owls men's basketball team represented Temple University in the 2007–08 NCAA Division I men's basketball season. They were led by head coach Fran Dunphy and played their home games at the Liacouras Center. The Owls are members of the Atlantic 10 Conference. They finished the season 21–13 and 11–5 in A-10 play. They won the 2008 Atlantic 10 men's basketball tournament to receive the conference's automatic bid to the 2008 NCAA Division I men's basketball tournament.

Roster

References

Temple
Temple Owls men's basketball seasons
Temple
Temple
Temple